Nazariy Vasylyovych Fedorivskyi (born 17 April 1996) is a Ukrainian professional footballer who plays as a goalkeeper for Obolon Kyiv.

He is product of Kyiv sports school Zmina-Obolon Kyiv. Fedorivskyi made his debut at senior level for Obolon Kyiv at the 2013 Ukrainian Football Amateur League after which his club was promoted to professional level. His professional level debut he made for Obolon on 9 November 2013 in a home game against Hirnyk Kryvyi Rih when he came out on substitute on 89th minute.

Still playing for Obolon, Fedorivskyi was recognized as the best player of September 2019 in the Ukrainian First League by PFL.

References

External links
 
 

1996 births
Living people
Footballers from Kyiv
Ukrainian footballers
Association football goalkeepers
FC Obolon-Brovar Kyiv players
FC Obolon-2 Kyiv players
Ukrainian First League players
Ukrainian Second League players
Ukraine youth international footballers
Ukraine under-21 international footballers